Coming Back Hard Again is an album by the American hip hop trio the Fat Boys, released in 1988.

The album peaked at No. 33 on the Billboard 200. It peaked at No. 98 on the UK Albums Chart.

Production
Chubby Checker appears on the Fat Boys' version of "The Twist". "Are You Ready for Freddy" was among the many late-1980s rap songs about A Nightmare on Elm Street. The album was produced by the Latin Rascals.

Critical reception
The Orlando Sentinel wrote: "'Jellyroll' and 'Big Daddy' are two of the better raps. The former sings the praises of pastry (then again, maybe not) while 'Big Daddy' boasts a steady reggae beat and alternates between straight rapping and Jamaican- style toasting." The Los Angeles Times called the album "highly enjoyable nonsense," writing that "you can knock the Fat Boys as lyricists—some of their songs are a bit too silly—but you can't rap their rhythms, which are among the catchiest in the genre." The Philadelphia Inquirer thought that "the straightforward rap songs, such as 'Rock the House, Y'all' and the title song, are pretty good, but the novelty songs wear thin very quickly."

AllMusic wrote that "the Fat Boys' strength remained novelty numbers and weight-based raps like 'Big Daddy' and 'Pig Feet'."

Track listing

References

The Fat Boys albums
Polydor Records albums
1988 albums